"Take Me to the Mardi Gras" is a song by the American singer-songwriter Paul Simon. It was the fourth single from his third studio album, There Goes Rhymin' Simon (1973), released on Columbia Records.

Smooth jazz keyboardist Bob James made an instrumental cover of the song for his 1975 album Two, whose intro has since become a widely recognized drum break.

Chart performance

The song only charted in the United Kingdom. It debuted on the UK Singles Chart on June 10, 1973 at a position of 36, rising over several weeks to a peak of number seven on July 8. In total, it spent eleven weeks on the chart. It is usually missing from UK hits compilations in favour of "Kodachrome" which was the  flip side to this. "Kodachrome" was the A side in the US, but the BBC would not play it in the UK because of its advertising policy.

Personnel
 Paul Simon - vocals, acoustic guitar
 Jimmy Johnson, Pete Carr - electric guitars
 David Hood - bass guitar
 Roger Hawkins - drums
 Barry Beckett - Wurlitzer electronic piano, Hammond organ
 The Onward Brass Band - brass
 Rev. Claude Jeter - bridge vocals

Charts

Notes

References

1973 singles
Paul Simon songs
Songs written by Paul Simon
Song recordings produced by Paul Simon
Columbia Records singles
Sampled drum breaks
1973 songs